Feng Jin (born 14 August 1993 in Chongqing) is a Chinese professional footballer who currently plays for Chinese Super League club Shanghai Port.

Club career
Feng Jin was promoted to Chongqing Lifan's first team squad in 2013 by the Head coach Wang Baoshan. He would make his debut in a Chinese FA Cup game against Xinjiang Youth on 24 April 2013 in a 4-1 victory. He would go on to make his league debut against Henan Jianye F.C. in a 2-1 defeat on 6 October 2013. The following season Feng was again used sparingly throughout the season, however he was part of the squad that went on to win the division championship and promotion back into the top tier. On 16 May 2015, he made his Super League debut in a 2–1 away defeat against Changchun Yatai, coming on as a substitute for Zhang Chiming in the 83rd minute.

International
He made his debut for China national football team on 7 June 2019 in an friendly against Philippines, as a 74th-minute substitute for Li Lei.

Career statistics

Club statistics
Statistics accurate as of match played 31 December 2022.

International goals
Scores and results list China's goal tally first.

Honours

Club
Chongqing Lifan
China League One: 2014

References

External links
 
 

1993 births
Living people
Chinese footballers
China international footballers
Footballers from Chongqing
Chongqing Liangjiang Athletic F.C. players
Chinese Super League players
China League One players
Association football midfielders